Chinnada Gombe is a 1964 Indian Kannada-language film,  directed and produced by B. R. Panthulu. The film stars Panthulu, Kalyan Kumar, Kalpana, M. V. Rajamma and Jayalalitha. The film has musical score by T. G. Lingappa. The film was simultaneously shot in Tamil as Muradan Muthu, and remade into Hindi as Gopi and in Telugu as Palleturi Chinnodu. This was Jayalalitha's leading debut, having previously acted as a child artiste.

Cast

Kalyan Kumar
Kalpana
J. Jayalalithaa 
B. R. Panthulu
M. V. Rajamma
Rajashankar 
Sandhya
B. Jaya
Baby Vishalakshi
Narasimharaju
Balakrishna
K. S. Ashwath

Production
Panthulu met Jayalalithaa at an event celebrating his film Karnan success, and Jayalalithaa's mother allowed her to be cast in Chinnada Gombe due to financial constraints.

Soundtrack
The music was composed by T. G. Lingappa.

References

External links 
 

1964 films
1960s Kannada-language films
Films scored by T. G. Lingappa
Kannada films remade in other languages
Films directed by B. R. Panthulu